Bridear (stylized as BRIDEAR) is a Japanese power metal band from Fukuoka, formed in 2011. It currently consists of singer Kimi, guitarists Moe and Ayumi, bassist Haru, and drummer Natsumi.  They are represented by Zest and release music under the Avex Trax label.

History 
Bridear was founded in Fukuoka in 2011 by singer Kimi, guitarist Mitsuru, and bassist Haru.  Support drummer Kai became an official member in February 2012. Second guitarist Misa joined the band in April, and Bridear had their first live that same month at Spiral Factory. Kimi, Haru, and Kai were previously in a band together, while Mitsuru and Misa were recruited from a website specifically for finding musicians. The demo "Pray/Another Name" was released in August 2012. First single "Thread of the Light/Roulette", released through Rock Stakk, and the extended play Overturn the Doom, through Movement Records, were released the following year.

In the subsequent two years, the single "Light in the Dark/No Salvation" (2014) and concert video Dear Bride (2015) were released. In March 2016, the band released their debut album, Baryte, which was released by Radtone Music, and promoted with an extensive tour of Japan. The EP released in 2017, Rise, was also released by Radtone. Citing musical differences, Misa left Bridear following an October 28, 2017 concert. She was replaced by Misaki, who made her live debut with the band on April 22, 2018. Another EP, Helix, was released on April 11, 2018, this time on Universal Music Japan. Another concert video, Live Tour 2018 Marcasite, was also released in 2018. After seven years, Mitsuru left the band after their December 30, 2018 concert, citing various differences about the direction of the band, both musical and otherwise. In 2019, Bridear joined the  talent management agency and switched to the label Avex Trax and released their second studio album Expose Your Emotions at the end of the same year.

In May 2021, the band released their third album, Bloody Bride, which was released internationally by Setsuzoku Records. In September and October 2021, the group toured several European cities. Misaki took medical leave in June 2022 and announced her departure from the band on July 11, replaced immediately by Moe.

Style 
According to Fabian Zeitlinger from Metalinside.de, Bridear stand out from other Japanese all-girl rock bands with their more modern sound, described as more of a "metalized" version of Band-Maid than melodic power metal like Aldious or Lovebites. On Bloody Bride, the group oscillates between aggressive power metal with double bass and poppy alternative metal. The band's lyrics are written in both Japanese and English. In a review on JRock News, Bloody Bride is described as a "marriage" between hard rock and progressive metal and a worthy successor to Expose Your Emotions. Shawn Kupfer, in his review for Idobi, describes the music as "fast-paced power metal with pop music sensibilities", evocative of X Japan's Blue Blood era, and concluded that Bridear's music shares the DNA of the New Wave of American Heavy Metal while also breaking new ground.

Members
Current members
 Kimi – vocals (2011–present)
 Haru – bass (2011–present)
 Ayumi – guitar (2019–present)
 Natsumi – drums (2019–present)
 Moe – guitar (2022–present)

Former members
 Mitsuru – guitar (2011–2018)
 Kai – drums (2012–2019)
 Misa – guitar (2012–2017)
 Misaki – guitar (2018–2022)
 Yuri – drums (2019)
 Vivi – drums (2019)

Discography

Albums

EPs

Singles

Digital singles

DVD

References

External links 

 

Japanese power metal musical groups
All-female bands
Musical groups established in 2011
2011 establishments in Japan
Universal Music Japan artists
Musical groups from Fukuoka Prefecture
Musical quintets
Avex Trax artists